Higuera de Vargas is a municipality in the province of Badajoz, Extremadura, Spain. It has a population of 2,011 and an area of 67.6 km².

References

Municipalities in the Province of Badajoz